These 163 species belong to Hebrus, a genus of velvet water bugs in the family Hebridae.

Hebrus species

 Hebrus acutiscutatus Brown, 1951 i g
 Hebrus adrienneaebrasili Poisson, 1944 i g
 Hebrus africanus Poisson, 1934 i g
 Hebrus alaotranus Poisson, 1949 i g
 Hebrus alluaudi Poisson, 1944 i g
 Hebrus angolensis Hoberlandt, 1951 i g
 Hebrus anjouani Poisson, 1959 i g
 Hebrus antinous Linnavuori, 1981 i g
 Hebrus aristomides Linnavuori, 1981 i g
 Hebrus arkhippe Cobben and Linnavuori, 1983 i g
 Hebrus atlas Kment, Jindra and Berchi, 2016 i g
 Hebrus atratus (Distant, 1909) i g
 Hebrus axillaris Horváth, 1902 i g
 Hebrus baigomi Poisson, 1951 i g
 Hebrus balnearis Bergroth, 1918 i g
 Hebrus beameri Porter, 1952 i c g
 Hebrus bengalensis Distant, 1909 i g
 Hebrus bergrothi Horváth, 1929 i g
 Hebrus berononoi Poisson, 1952 i g
 Hebrus bertrandi Poisson, 1960 i g
 Hebrus bilineatus Champion, 1898 i g
 Hebrus bimaculatus Cobben, 1982 i g
 Hebrus birmensis Zettel, 2011 i g
 Hebrus bituberculatus Zettel, 2006 i g
 Hebrus bombayensis Paiva, 1919 i g
 Hebrus boukali Zettel, 2000 i g
 Hebrus browni Poisson, 1956 i g
 Hebrus buenoi Drake & Harris, 1943 i c g b  (Bueno's velvet water bug)
 Hebrus burmeisteri Lethierry & Severin, 1896 i c g b
 Hebrus caeruleus Poisson, 1934 i g
 Hebrus campestris Linnavuori, 1971 i g
 Hebrus camposi Drake and Chapman, 1954 i g
 Hebrus carayoni Poisson, 1951 i g
 Hebrus catus Drake and Chapman, 1958 i g
 Hebrus cebuensis Zettel, 2006 i g
 Hebrus chappuisi Poisson, 1944 i g
 Hebrus comatus Drake and Harris, 1943 i c g
 Hebrus concinnus Uhler, 1894 i c g
 Hebrus consolidus Uhler, 1894 i c g b
 Hebrus cruciatus (Distant, 1910) i g
 Hebrus dartevellei Poisson, 1957 i g
 Hebrus drakei Porter, 1959 i g
 Hebrus dubius Poisson, 1944 i g
 Hebrus eckerleini (Jordan, 1954) i g
 Hebrus ecuadoris Drake and Harris, 1943 i g
 Hebrus elegans Lundblad, 1933 i g
 Hebrus elimatus Drake and Cobben, 1960 i g
 Hebrus engaeus Drake and Chapman, 1958 i g
 Hebrus fischeri Zettel, 2004 i g
 Hebrus franzi (Wagner, 1957) i g
 Hebrus fulvinervis Horváth, 1929 i g
 Hebrus gembuanus Linnavuori, 1981 i g
 Hebrus gerardi Poisson, 1950 i g
 Hebrus gidshaensis Cobben, 1982 i g
 Hebrus gloriosus Drake and Harris, 1943 i g
 Hebrus haddeni Porter, 1954 i g
 Hebrus hamdoumi Poisson, 1951 i g
 Hebrus harrisi Porter, 1959 i g
 Hebrus hasegawai Miyamoto, 1964 i g
 Hebrus hirsutulus Zettel, 2004 i g
 Hebrus hirsutus Champion, 1898 i g
 Hebrus hissarensis Kanyukova, 1997 i g
 Hebrus hoberlandti Porter, 1959 i g
 Hebrus houti Poisson, 1956 i g
 Hebrus hubbardi Porter, 1952 i c g
 Hebrus humeralis Horváth, 1929 i g
 Hebrus hungerfordi Drake and Harris, 1943 i g
 Hebrus ifellus Linnavuori, 1973 i g
 Hebrus iheriri Poisson, 1953 i g
 Hebrus ilaira Cobben and Linnavuori, 1983 i g
 Hebrus ilocanus Zettel, 2014 i g
 Hebrus isaloi Poisson, 1951 i g
 Hebrus jeanneli Poisson, 1944 i g
 Hebrus judithae Zettel, 2006 i g
 Hebrus kanseniae Poisson, 1950 i g
 Hebrus kasompii Poisson, 1964 i g
 Hebrus katompei Poisson, 1950 i g
 Hebrus kheiron Linnavuori, 1981 i g
 Hebrus kiritshenkoi Kanyukova, 1997 i g
 Hebrus kundelungui Poisson, 1957 i g
 Hebrus lacunatus Drake and Chapman, 1958 i g
 Hebrus lacustris Zettel, 2006 i g
 Hebrus laeviventris Champion, 1898 i g
 Hebrus latensis (Hale, 1926) i g
 Hebrus leleupi Cobben, 1982 i g
 Hebrus liliimacula Horváth, 1929 i g
 Hebrus limnaeus Drake and Chapman, 1958 i g
 Hebrus linnavuorii J. Polhemus, 1989 i g
 Hebrus lokobei Poisson, 1951 i g
 Hebrus longicornis Linnavuori, 1981 i g
 Hebrus longipilosus Zettel, 2002 i g
 Hebrus longisetosus Zettel, 2004 i g
 Hebrus longivillus J. Polhemus and McKinnon, 1983 i c g
 Hebrus lucidus Poisson, 1952 i g
 Hebrus machadoi Hoberlandt, 1951 i g
 Hebrus major Champion, 1898 i c g
 Hebrus manamboloi Poisson, 1952 i g
 Hebrus mancinii Poisson, 1955 i g
 Hebrus mangrovensis J. Polhemus and D. Polhemus, 1989 i g
 Hebrus megacephalus Miyamoto, 1965 i g
 Hebrus mizae Hoberlandt, 1951 i g
 Hebrus modestus Poisson, 1952 i g
 Hebrus montanus Kolenati, 1857 i g
 Hebrus monteithii Lansbury, 1990 i g
 Hebrus murphyi Zettel, 2004 i g
 Hebrus nasus Zettel, 2000 i g
 Hebrus nereis J. Polhemus and D. Polhemus, 1989 i g
 Hebrus nieseri Zettel, 2004 i g
 Hebrus nipponicus Horváth, 1929 i g
 Hebrus nkoupi Poisson, 1951 i g
 Hebrus nourlangiei Lansbury, 1990 i g
 Hebrus nubilis Drake and Harris, 1943 i g
 Hebrus obscurus J. Polhemus and Chapman, 1966 i c g
 Hebrus orientalis Distant, 1904 i g
 Hebrus oxianus Kanyukova, 1997 i g
 Hebrus palawanensis Zettel, 2004 i g
 Hebrus pamanzii Poisson, 1959 i g
 Hebrus pangantihoni Zettel, 2006 i g
 Hebrus papuanus Horváth, 1929 i g
 Hebrus parameralis Zettel, 2004 i g
 Hebrus parvulus Stål, 1858 i g
 Hebrus paulus Drake and Harris, 1943 i g
 Hebrus peculiaris Horváth, 1929 i g
 Hebrus perplexus Poisson, 1944 i g
 Hebrus philippinus Zettel, 2006 i g
 Hebrus pictipennis Zettel, 2004 i g
 Hebrus pilipes Kanyukova, 1997 i g
 Hebrus pilosellus Kanyukova, 1997 i g
 Hebrus pilosidorsus J. Polhemus and Chapman, 1970 i g
 Hebrus pilosus Andersen and Weir, 2004 i g
 Hebrus plaumanni Porter, 1952 i g
 Hebrus polysetosus Zettel, 2004 i g
 Hebrus priscus Drake and Harris, 1943 i g
 Hebrus pseudocruciatus Zettel, 2004 i g
 Hebrus pseudopusillus Cobben, 1982 i g
 Hebrus pudoris Drake and Harris, 1943 i g
 Hebrus pusillus (Fallén, 1807) i c g
 Hebrus rhodesiana Poisson, 1964 i g
 Hebrus rogbanei Poisson, 1960 i g
 Hebrus rufescens Bergroth, 1918 i g
 Hebrus ruficeps Thomson, 1871 i g
 Hebrus saxatilis Linnavuori, 1971 i g
 Hebrus schillhammeri Zettel, 2011 i g
 Hebrus scutelloacutus Poisson, 1952 i g
 Hebrus seychellensis D. Polhemus, 1992 i g
 Hebrus seyferti Zettel, 2006 i g
 Hebrus sobrinus Uhler, 1877 i c g
 Hebrus spiculus J. Polhemus and McKinnon, 1983 i g
 Hebrus spinitibialis Cobben, 1982 i g
 Hebrus sulcatus Champion, 1898 i g
 Hebrus syriacus Horváth, 1896 i g
 Hebrus thymoma Cobben and Linnavuori, 1983 i g
 Hebrus timasiformis Zettel, 2004 i g
 Hebrus tsimbazazae Poisson, 1951 i g
 Hebrus tuberculifer Zettel, 2006 i g
 Hebrus tuckahoanus Drake and Chapman, 1954 i c g
 Hebrus ullrichi Zettel, 2004 i g
 Hebrus ulului Poisson, 1960 i g
 Hebrus usingeri Drake and Harris, 1943 i g
 Hebrus vaillanti Poisson, 1953 i g
 Hebrus vietnamensis Zettel and Tran, 2016 i g
 Hebrus violaceus Poisson, 1944 i g
 Hebrus wygodzinskyi Hoberlandt, 1951 i g

Data sources: i = ITIS, c = Catalogue of Life, g = GBIF, b = Bugguide.net

References

Hebrus